Dream House is a 2011 American psychological thriller film directed by Jim Sheridan from Universal Pictures and Morgan Creek Productions, starring Daniel Craig, Rachel Weisz, Naomi Watts, and Marton Csokas. It was released on September 30, 2011, in the United States and Canada and was panned by critics. It was released by Warner Bros. in international markets.

Plot
Will Atenton (Daniel Craig), a successful editor for a New York City publishing house, quits his job to focus on writing a book while spending more time with his wife Libby (Rachel Weisz) and their young daughters, Trish and Dee Dee. The family is initially happy to live in their Fairfield County "dream house" near the forest. Soon, however, they grow uneasy because of a series of unsettling events, including one in which the children see a strange man lurking outside and another involving Will discovering teenagers gathering in the basement. It all seems to tie to a crime committed in the house five years earlier, when a man named Peter Ward apparently murdered his wife and two children and was committed to a mental hospital from which he has been recently released due to lack of evidence.

Will tries to enlist the help of the local police, but they appear unwilling to assist. He also approaches his neighbor Ann (Naomi Watts), who seems apprehensive, while her estranged husband Jack (Marton Csokas) demonstrates outright hostility toward Will. Will decides to conduct his own investigations, visiting the facility where Peter Ward was housed, and discovers that he actually is Peter Ward. 

During the attack that claimed the lives of his wife and daughters, Peter was shot in the head, so he has no memories of the murders. In order to cope with the grief, he fabricated a delusion in which his family is still alive and created a new identity for himself based on his inpatient ID band "W1-1L 8-10-10". Once dismissed, Peter moved back to his abandoned house, which is now condemned and covered in graffiti, but in Peter's mind, it is still unspoiled and inhabited by Libby and the girls.

Peter is forcibly removed from the dilapidated house by authorities and is taken in by Ann, who believes in his innocence and used to visit him at the facility. She encourages Peter to move on, but Peter eventually returns to the house to confront his memories, ultimately discovering that he did not kill his wife and children; it was a local man named Boyce (Elias Koteas), who broke into the house and shot Peter's family. Libby, while aiming at Boyce, accidentally shot Peter.

Peter and Ann are suddenly attacked by Jack, who reveals that he had hired Boyce to kill Ann five years earlier, in retaliation for divorcing him and to obtain full custody of their daughter, Chloe. However, Boyce went to the wrong house and mistakenly killed Peter's family. Aided by Boyce, Jack decides to kill Ann himself and set the house on fire, framing Peter for her murder. He also shoots Boyce to eliminate him as a witness (and for attacking the wrong family). As Jack ignites a fire, Peter overpowers Jack and saves Ann with the help of his wife Libby who is revealed to be a spirit, as are their daughters, and not a mental projection. Boyce douses Jack in gasoline before being killed, this results in Jack burning to death when he tries to escape through the flames.

While Ann and Chloe reunite, Peter says goodbye to the spirits of his wife and children.

Sometime later, we see that Peter has returned to New York and published a best-selling book called Dream House, in which he recounts his tragic experiences.

Cast

Production
Director Jim Sheridan reportedly clashed with Morgan Creek's James G. Robinson constantly on the set over the shape of the script and production of the film. According to the Los Angeles Times, Sheridan tried to take his name off the film after being unhappy with it and his relationship with Morgan Creek Productions.

Reportedly Sheridan, Daniel Craig and Rachel Weisz disliked the final cut of the film.  The trailer, cut by Morgan Creek Productions, was criticised for revealing the film's main plot twist.

Soundtrack

The score to Dream House was composed by John Debney and conducted by Robert Ziegler.  Christian Clemmensen, reviewer of Filmtracks.com, gave it four out of five stars, declaring it "among the biggest surprises of 2011" and stating, "It's not clear how badly Debney's work for Dream House was butchered by the studio's frantic last minute attempts to make the film presentable, but Debney's contribution does feature a cohesive flow of development that is, at least on album, a worthy souvenir from this otherwise messy situation."  The soundtrack was released on 11 October 2011 and features 15 tracks of score at a running time of 56 minutes.

Reception
The film was not screened in advance for critics and was critically panned. On review aggregation Rotten Tomatoes the film has an approval rating of 6% based on 86 reviews, with a rating average of 3.7/10. The site's critical consensus reads, "Dream House is punishingly slow, stuffy and way too obvious to be scary." Metacritic, which assigns a weighted average rating to reviews, gives the film a score of 35 out of 100, based on 16 critics, indicating "generally unfavorable reviews". Audiences polled by CinemaScore gave the film an average grade of "B" on an A+ to F scale.

Reboot
In 2021, it was reported that Morgan Creek Entertainment would be developing a reboot of the film.

See also
 Rabbit Hole (Play)
 Rabbit Hole (Film)
 Talaash

References
  Content in this article was copied from Dream House (film) at the Universal Monsters wiki, which is licensed under the Creative Commons Attribution-Share Alike 3.0 (Unported) (CC BY-SA 3.0) license.

External links
 
 
 

2010s psychological drama films
2010s ghost films
2010s mystery thriller films
2011 psychological thriller films
American ghost films
American mystery thriller films
American psychological thriller films
Canadian mystery thriller films
Canadian psychological thriller films
English-language Canadian films
Fiction with unreliable narrators
Films scored by John Debney
Films about contract killing
Films about writers
Films directed by Jim Sheridan
Films set in country houses
Films shot in Toronto
Morgan Creek Productions films
Universal Pictures films
Warner Bros. films
2011 drama films
2011 films
2010s English-language films
2010s American films
2010s Canadian films